Siva Reddy is an Indian mimicry artist, comedian and actor. He has worked in over 100 films in Telugu. He is popular for his imitation of popular Telugu film actors.

TV shows
 Gemini TV  - Jalsa (As an Anchor)
 Zee Telugu -  Chittam chittam Praya chittam
 Gemini TV  - Koteswara Rao
 Maa TV – Gharshana Dance Show
 ETV - Comedy Gang
 Gemini TV - Joolakataka (as Judge)

Live shows
 Stage Show for Y.S. Rajashekhar Reddy
 Sakshi – Vinayaka chavithi – 2013
 TV 9-  – Vinayaka chavithi – 2012
 Vajrotsavam

Filmography

Awards
 Nandi award
 Bharathamuni award - 5 Awards
 The Vamsi-Berkely award for Athade Oka Sainyam
 Bharata-Muni award for Ammai Kosam
 The prestigious Relangi award and Yuvatarang award
 Jhendhyala award
 Rajababu award
 Relangi award
 Vamsi Barkil award
 Yuvatharanga award
 Jhoshna Kalapitam award
 Tirupati Kalpitha Ghantasala award
 Comedy Titan award
 Bahumukha Nata Dhvani Anukarana Durienaa
 Fun Star

References

Telugu comedians
Telugu male actors
Ventriloquists
Living people
Indian impressionists (entertainers)
People from Karimnagar
People from Telangana
1977 births